Benjamin Peter Waine (born 11 June 2001) is a New Zealand professional footballer who plays as a forward for English League One club Plymouth Argyle and the New Zealand national football team.

Club career

Wellington Phoenix
On 7 August 2018, Waine made his debut for the senior side in their FFA Cup loss to Bentleigh Greens.

After his debut for the Phoenix in the FFA, Waine played most of his games for the Wellington Phoenix Reserves in the ISPS Handa Premiership scoring a team high of 8 goals, before getting called up to the senior team again in March 2019

On 30 March 2019, Waine made his professional debut for the Wellington Phoenix coming on as a substitute in their 4–1 win over the Newcastle Jets.

On 28 April 2019, Waine made his first start for the Phoenix in a 5–0 loss to the Perth Glory.

On 21 June 2019, Waine signed a two-year contract with the Phoenix. The first year being a scholarship deal, with the second year moving him onto a full-time contract. Just before the 2019–20 season kicked off, the first year of this contract was upgraded to full-time.

On 3 November 2019, Waine scored his first professional goal off the bench in Wellington's 3–2 loss to Melbourne City, passing Liberato Cacace to become the youngest goalscorer in the club's history at 18 years and 145 days.

Plymouth Argyle
On 30 December 2022, Waine agreed to join League One leaders Plymouth Argyle for an undisclosed fee on a two-and-a-half year deal, the transfer going through on 1 January when the transfer window opened.

International career

New Zealand U-20s
On 16 April 2019, Waine was selected as one of the 21 players for the New Zealand U-20 who played at the 2019 FIFA U-20 World Cup in Poland. He scored a brace in their opening match against Honduras on 24 May. He made two further appearances in the tournament, starting in both New Zealand's 2–0 victory over Norway and the 1–1 loss on penalties to Colombia in the Round of 16.

New Zealand U-23s
In September, Waine was a member of the New Zealand U-23 team, known as the "Oly-Whites", who took part in the 2019 OFC Men's Olympic Qualifying Tournament. He was second top goal scorer for the tournament with 8 goals including one in the final, helping New Zealand to qualify for the 2020 Summer Olympics in Tokyo.

New Zealand
Waine made his international debut, including scoring his first international goal for New Zealand in their World Cup qualification match against Papua New Guinea, winning the game 1–0.

Career statistics
As of match played 19 March 2022

International 
As of match played 21 March 2022.

International goals
Scores and results list the New Zealand goal tally first.

Personal life
Waine attended school at Hutt International Boys' School in Upper Hutt where he was the Junior school captain in 2019.

References

External links

2001 births
Living people
Association footballers from Wellington City
Association football forwards
New Zealand association footballers
Wellington Phoenix FC players
Plymouth Argyle F.C. players
New Zealand youth international footballers
New Zealand Football Championship players
A-League Men players
Footballers at the 2020 Summer Olympics
Olympic association footballers of New Zealand
New Zealand under-20 international footballers
New Zealand expatriate association footballers
New Zealand expatriate sportspeople in England
Expatriate footballers in England
English Football League players